The 2006 California State Treasurer election occurred on November 7, 2006. The primary elections took place on June 6, 2006. Attorney General Bill Lockyer, the Democratic nominee, easily defeated the Republican nominee, Board of Equalization member Claude Parrish, for the office previously held by Democrat Phil Angelides, who was term-limited and ran for governor.

Primary results
A bar graph of statewide results in this contest are available at https://web.archive.org/web/20070517094424/http://primary2006.ss.ca.gov/Returns/trs/00.htm.

Results by county are available here and here.

Republican

Candidates 
Claude Parrish, Board of Equalization member

Keith Richman, Assemblyman

Others

Results

Results by county
Results from the Secretary of State of California:

See also
California state elections, 2006
State of California
California State Treasurer

References

External links
VoteCircle.com Non-partisan resources & vote sharing network for Californians
Information on the elections from California's Secretary of State
Official Homepage of the California State Treasurer

California state treasurer elections

2006 California elections
California